KKRV (104.7 FM) is a radio station broadcasting a country music format. Licensed to Wenatchee, Washington, United States, the station serves the Wenatchee area. The station is currently owned by Alpha Media LLC, through Alpha Media Licensee LLC. The station is also simulcast on one broadcast translator - 105.1 FM.

History
The station went on the air as KYJR-FM on 1981-05-20 as Top 40/Hard Rock station Y-105.  On 1988-11-03, the station changed its call sign to KSSY when it had a format change to Adult Contemporary (Classy 105). On 1995-05-29 the call sign was changed to the current KKRV, to reflect the move to a classic rock format and its new branding as "The River". The station switched to its current country format in 1998.

On May 20, 2014, KKRV became the first Wenatchee-area commercial station to broadcast in HD Radio. It added a simulcast of sister station KWLN on HD2 to provide better coverage in the broadcast area.

94.3 Jack FM

On April 1, 2018, Jack FM was launched, and a HD3 subchannel was added to KKRV to carry the Jack FM simulcast.

The HD3 channel can also be heard on 94.3 FM K232ED (hence the branding as 94.3 Jack FM), a frequency that was originally to be used to simulcast KKRT's signal to Zune and other radio receivers that didn't pick up AM signals, but was later abandoned. Before the switch, it carried a simulcast of KKRV.

References

External links

KRV
Alpha Media radio stations